or  is an island in Harstad Municipality in Troms og Finnmark county, Norway. The  island lies just north of the large island of Hinnøya and south of the island of Bjarkøya. It is surrounded by the Vågsfjorden in the east and the Andfjorden in the west. The population of Grytøya (2017) is 433. The southeastern part of the island is the most agriculturally productive.

The northern part of the island was formerly part of the old municipality of Bjarkøy, which merged with Harstad Municipality on 1 January 2013.

Transportation
There is a ferry connection from Bjørnå (on Grytøya) to Vika (on the neighboring island of Hinnøya), just north of the town of Harstad. The main road on the island follows the coastline from the northeast at Fenes to Grotavær in the northwest. There is very little settlement on the northern coast, and no road connections there.

There used to be ferry connections to the neighboring islands of Bjarkøya and Sandsøya, but the Bjarkøy Fixed Link project created a bridge and undersea tunnel system connecting the three islands. They will open in late 2018.

Media gallery

See also
List of islands of Norway

References

External links

Bjarkøy
Harstad
Islands of Troms og Finnmark